Pałki  is a village in the administrative district of Gmina Zadzim, within Poddębice County, Łódź Voivodeship, in central Poland.In Pałki is big wood & "Lutowie" sea.Pałki territory is a 859 ha. two position in Gmina Zadzim It lies approximately  north-west of Zadzim,  south-west of Poddębice, and  west of the regional capital Łódź.

Pałki composed of 2 parts : Pałki and Pałki II.

References

Villages in Poddębice County